Death of a Telemarketer is a 2020 American thriller comedy-drama film written and directed by Khaled Ridgeway and starring Lamorne Morris, Jackie Earle Haley, Haley Joel Osment and Alisha Wainwright.  It is Ridgeway's feature directorial debut.

Cast
Lamorne Morris as Kasey Miller
Jackie Earle Haley as Asa Ellenbogen
Haley Joel Osment as Jim/Dean
Alisha Wainwright as Christine
Woody McClain as Barry
Matt McGorry as Andy
Gil Ozeri as Justin
Sujata Day as Shelly
David So as Rick
Ian Verdun as Officer Brian Gerard
Gwen Gottlieb as Liz
Starletta DuPois as Mrs. Gordon

Production
Filming began in Los Angeles in September 2019.

Release
The film premiered at the 2020 American Black Film Festival and later showed at the 2020 Austin Film Festival in 2020.

In October 2021, it was announced that Sony Pictures Worldwide Acquisitions acquired global rights to the film.

The film was released in theaters and On Demand on December 3, 2021.

Reception
The film has a 20% rating on Rotten Tomatoes based on 10 reviews, with an average rating of 4.6/10.

Awards
The film won the Fan Favorite Film Award at the 2020 American Black Film Festival.

The film also won the best feature award at the 2021 Martha’s Vineyard African American Film Festival.

References

External links
 
 
 

2020 films
2020 directorial debut films
American comedy-drama films
American comedy thriller films
American thriller drama films
Vertical Entertainment films
2020s English-language films
2020s American films